Cesare Angelini (July 4, 1901 – August 4, 1974) was an Italian Christian Democrat politician. He was born in Lucca. He served in the Senate of Italy in Legislature I (1948–1953), Legislature II, Legislature III, Legislature IV and Legislature V.

1901 births
1974 deaths
Politicians from Lucca
Christian Democracy (Italy) politicians
Senators of Legislature I of Italy
Senators of Legislature II of Italy
Senators of Legislature III of Italy
Senators of Legislature IV of Italy
Senators of Legislature V of Italy
Politicians of Tuscany